Elizabeth Joan Batham (2 December 1917 – 8 July 1974) was a New Zealand marine biologist and university lecturer. A past president of the New Zealand Marine Sciences Society and a Fellow of the Royal Society of New Zealand, Batham directed the Portobello Marine Biological Station at the University of Otago for more than 23 years.

Biography
Batham was born in Dunedin, New Zealand on 2 December 1917. She graduated from the University of Otago, where she later taught and conducted research. She went to the University of Cambridge for doctoral studies, where she researched the sea anemone and worked as an assistant to zoologist Carl Pantin. In 1947, Batham won the Royal Society of New Zealand's Hamilton Memorial Prize, which recognises outstanding work by an early-career researcher.

In 1951, after the University of Otago took over the fisheries facility that became known as the Portobello Marine Biological Station, Batham was named its director and served there for 23 years. She was made a Fellow of the Royal Society of New Zealand in 1962. and served a term as president of the New Zealand Marine Sciences Society.

Batham began scuba diving later in her career, believing it to be important to her work. Shortly after stepping down from her post at Portobello due to poor health, she disappeared near the shore of Seatoun in July 1974. She is presumed to have drowned in a scuba diving accident.

Legacy
In 2004, the University of Otago Department of Marine Science established the Elizabeth Batham Prize in Marine Science. In 2017, she was selected as one of the Royal Society of New Zealand's "150 women in 150 words".

In 1965, malacologist Winston Ponder named the gastropod species Eatoniella bathamae after Batham, as thanks for her assistance when Ponder stayed at the Portobello Marine Laboratory.

References

External links
Dr Batham discussing Portabello aquarium
  

1917 births
1974 deaths
New Zealand marine biologists
Academic staff of the University of Otago
Scientists from Dunedin
New Zealand women academics
University of Otago alumni
Fellows of the Royal Society of New Zealand
20th-century New Zealand zoologists